John Bethune (19 October 1888 – 23 January 1955), also known as Jack Bethune and Jock Bethune, was a professional association footballer, who played in both the Scottish Football League and The Football League.

Born in Milngavie near Glasgow, Bethune began his career by playing local football in the Glasgow area for Ashfield. He joined Edinburgh-based side Heart of Midlothian in 1912, for whom he played three times in the Scottish League in a brief spell with them before moving to English clubs Darlington and then Barnsley still within 1912. He settled in Barnsley for almost eight years in a period that was interrupted by the First World War, making over 100 Football League appearances for them.

Bethune, who was known to have a quick temper, joined Bristol Rovers in 1920 for their first season as a Football League club but left for a trial with Brentford in 1921. He played six League games during his trial, and a further four after signing for them permanently, but an injury suffered on Boxing Day that year ended his League career.

He went on to play non-League football for Sittingbourne and Sittingbourne Paper Mills and after retiring as a footballer represented England at indoor bowls in 1936 and 1938.

References

1888 births
1955 deaths
People from Milngavie
Scottish footballers
Association football fullbacks
Scottish Football League players
English Football League players
Heart of Midlothian F.C. players
Darlington F.C. players
Barnsley F.C. players
Bristol Rovers F.C. players
Brentford F.C. players
English male bowls players
Sittingbourne F.C. players
Ashfield F.C. players
Vale of Clyde F.C. players
Hamilton Academical F.C. players
Bonnyrigg Rose Athletic F.C. players